Haemanota beneluzi is a moth of the family Erebidae. It is found in French Guiana.

References

External links

Haemanota
Moths described in 2001
Endemic fauna of French Guiana
Moths of South America